Kamakis (or Kamaki's) is an area located along the Nairobi Eastern Bypass Highway. Often referred to as "Nairobi's Nyama Choma Belt", the area is administratively in Ruiru, Kiambu County which by extension falls within the greater Nairobi Metropolitan Region.

Commerce
Kamakis started off as a Nyama choma (grilled meat) shopping center, often getting recognized among popular Nyama Choma joints in Kenya. 

With time, thanks to its strategic location, it metamorphosed into a commercial center featuring top-tier banks, fast-food joints like KFC and modern-day infrastructure.

As of 2023, banks like DTB  and hospitals like the Aga Khan University Hospital  had since set up shop in the area.

References

Kiambu County
Nairobi
Populated places in Central Province (Kenya)